Archeophone Records is a record company and label founded in 1998 to document the early days of America's recording history. It was started by Richard Martin and Meagan Hennessey, a husband and wife who run the company in Champaign, Illinois. Archeophone restores and remasters audio from cylinders and discs of jazz, popular music, vaudeville, and spoken word recordings.

Archeophone has released recordings by Billy Murray, Bert Williams, Guido Deiro, Nora Bayes, Jack Norworth, Eddie Morton, and by jazz ensembles the Six Brown Brothers, the Benson Orchestra of Chicago, and Art Hickman's Orchestra.

Compilations include Vess Ossman, Arthur Collins and Byron G. Harlan, Henry Burr, Bob Roberts, Ada Jones, Fred Van Eps,  Sophie Tucker, Harry Lauder, and the American, Peerless, and Haydn Quartets.

The company is not affiliated with the Archéophone manufacturer Henri Chamoux.

Awards and honors
 Grammy Award for Best Historical Album, Lost Sounds: Blacks and the Birth of the Recording Industry, 1891–1922, 2006

Grammy Award nominations
Best Historical Album
 Actionable Offenses: Indecent Phonograph Recordings from the 1890s (2007)
 Debate '08: Taft and Bryan Campaign on the Edison Phonograph (2008)
 Sophie Tucker, Origins of the Red Hot Mama, 1910-1922 (2009)
 Isham Jones, Happy: The 1920 Rainbo Orchestra Sides (2014)
 Waxing the Gospel: Mass Evangelism & the Phonograph, 1890–1900 (2016)

Best Album Notes
 Actionable Offenses: Indecent Phonograph Recordings from the 1890s (2007)
 Debate '08: Taft and Bryan Campaign on the Edison Phonograph (2008)
 Sophie Tucker, Origins of the Red Hot Mama, 1910–1922 (2009)
 There Breathes a Hope: The Legacy of John Work II and His Fisk Jubilee Quartet, 1909–1916 (2010)
 Isham Jones, Happy: The 1920 Rainbo Orchestra Sides (2014)
 Joseph C. Smith's Orchestra, Songs of the Night: Dance Recordings, 1916–1925 (2015)
 Waxing the Gospel: Mass Evangelism & the Phonograph, 1890–1900 (2016)

See also
 List of record labels

References

External links
 

American record labels
Reissue record labels
Jazz record labels
Companies based in Champaign County, Illinois
Champaign, Illinois